The Autovía A-77 is a highway in the northwest of Alicante, Spain. Its length is about 7 km. This road runs from the junction with Autovía A-70, in the direction of Alcoy, towards the Autovía A-7 and Autopista AP-7.

References 

A-77
A-77
Alicante